The Night of the Wild Donkeys or  De Nacht van de Wilde Ezels  is a 1991 Dutch film directed by Pim de la Parra.

Cast
Pim de la Parra	... 	Waldo van Romondt
Liz Snoyink	... 	Joanna van Romondt
Camilla Braaksma	... 	Carmen Helman
Kenneth Herdigein	... 	Patrick Delprado
Hans Dagelet	... 	Jack de Boer
Manouk van der Meulen	... 	Mathilde Vanessen
Jake Kruyer	... 	John Bob
Marian Mudder	... 	Marouska (as Marian Morée)
Gert-Jan Louwe	... 	Laurens Lang
Isabella Van Rooy	... 	Lovanna
Martijn Apituley	... 	Vincent de Leeuw
Marie Kooyman	... 	Helen de Boer
Carel Donck	... 	Jan Slokker
Bonnie Williams	... 	Maureen Schwarzenegger
Harriët Beudeker	... 	Lid van meisjesbende

External links 
 

Dutch drama films
1991 films
1990s Dutch-language films